Timbale may refer to:

Timpani, kettledrums, spelled "timbale" in some languages
Timbale (food), a kind of dish of various ingredients baked in a round mold

See also
Timbales or timbal, a Cuban and Latin American percussion instrument
Timbau or timbal, a Brazilian drum